This is a list of Australian domestic television series that debuted in 2010.

Premieres

Free-to-air television

Subscription television

Additional
Ghozt Crew — Australian paranormal documentary series.

Notes

References 

Series premieres
Premieres